

Acts of the National Assembly for Wales

|-
| {{|Renting Homes (Fees etc.) (Wales) Act 2019|cyshort=Deddf Rhentu Cartrefi (Ffioedd etc.) (Cymru) 2019|anaw|2|15-05-2019|maintained=y|archived=n|An Act of the National Assembly for Wales prohibiting persons from requiring certain payments to be made or certain other steps to be taken in consideration of the grant, renewal or continuance of a standard occupation contract, or pursuant to a term of a standard occupation contract; to make provision about holding deposits and in relation to requirements to publicise certain fees charged by letting agents; and for connected purposes.|cylong=Deddf Cynulliad Cenedlaethol Cymru sy'n gwahardd personau rhag ei gwneud yn ofynnol i daliadau penodol gael eu gwneud neu i gamau penodol eraill gael eu cymryd yn gydnabyddiaeth am roi neu am adnewyddu contract meddiannaeth safonol, neu am barhau â chontract o'r fath, neu yn unol â theler mewn contract meddiannaeth safonol; i wneud darpariaeth ynghylch blaendaliadau cadw ac mewn perthynas â gofynion i roi cyhoeddusrwydd i ffioedd penodol a godir gan asiantiaid gosod eiddo; ac at ddibenion cysylltiedig.}}
|-
| {{|Public Services Ombudsman (Wales) Act 2019|cyshort=Deddf Ombwdsmon Gwasanaethau Cyhoeddus (Cymru) 2019|anaw|3|22-05-2019|maintained=y|archived=n|An Act of the National Assembly for Wales to make provision about the office of the Public Services Ombudsman for Wales; to make provision about the functions of the Public Services Ombudsman for Wales; to make provision about compensation; and for connected purposes.|cylong=Deddf Cynulliad Cenedlaethol Cymru i wneud darpariaeth ynghylch swydd Ombwdsmon Gwasanaethau Cyhoeddus Cymru; i wneud darpariaeth ynghylch swyddogaethau Ombwdsmon Gwasanaethau Cyhoeddus Cymru; i wneud darpariaeth ynghylch digolledu; ac at ddibenion cysylltiedig.}}
|-
| {{|Legislation (Wales) Act 2019|cyshort=Deddf Deddfwriaeth (Cymru) 2019|anaw|4|10-09-2019|maintained=y|archived=n|An Act of the National Assembly for Wales to promote the accessibility of Welsh law; to provide for the interpretation and operation of Welsh legislation; and for connected purposes.|cylong=Deddf Cynulliad Cenedlaethol Cymru i hybu hygyrchedd cyfraith Cymru; i ddarparu ar gyfer dehongli a gweithredu deddfwriaeth Cymru; ac at ddibenion cysylltiedig.}}
}}

References

2019